Sir James Gilbert Hardy OBE AASA (born 20 November 1932) is an Australian winemaker and businessman who is also noted for his yachting achievements.

History
A great-grandson of the South Australian winemaker Thomas Hardy, James Hardy was born at Seacliff, South Australia on 20 November 1932.

His father, Tom Mayfield Hardy, who was appointed chairman and managing director of Thomas Hardy and Sons in 1924, was one of those killed near Mount Dandenong on 25 October 1938 in the crash of the plane "Kyeema". Tom Hardy was a noted sailor, associated with the yacht Nerida at the Royal South Australian Yacht Squadron.

Hardy was educated at Brighton Primary School, St. Peter's College and the South Australian Institute of Technology. On leaving school, he spent two years share farming at Port Vincent, South Australia, then joined the family wine company Thomas Hardy and Sons in 1953, working as a shipping clerk. He then served as Sales Supervisor from 1957 to 1961, then as Regional Director for the Eastern States of Australia, when he and his family moved permanently to Sydney with a residence at Manly. He was appointed chairman in 1981 and non-executive director in 1992 when it merged to become BRL Hardy Wine Company.

Yachting
A renowned world champion yachtsman, Hardy represented Australia at two Olympic Games (1964 in Tokyo and 1968 in Mexico City), skippered three America's Cup challenges (in 1970, 1974 and 1980), and competed in four Admiral's Cup Ocean Racing Championships.

Public service
Hardy has served 25 years on the executive committee of the Neurosurgical Research Foundation of South Australia

He was Chair of the Federal Government's Natural Heritage Trust Advisory Committee for 8 years

He is a former Chairman of the Landcare Foundation.

Honours
In 1975, in recognition of his contribution to sailing and the community, he was appointed an Officer of the Order of the British Empire (OBE).

In 1981 he was invested a Knight Bachelor by Queen Elizabeth II, for services to yachting.

In 1994, Hardy was inducted into the America's Cup Hall of Fame.

In 2000 he was awarded the Australian Sports Medal.

He was Chairman of Sydney's Australia Day Regatta, serving from 2004 until 2011, and is a patron of numerous organizations and charities.

Hardy also has a street named after him in the South Australian suburb of Woodcroft.

Family
Hardy married Anne Christine Jackson on 29 December 1956. They had two sons:
 David Ponder Hardy
 Richard James Hardy

Freemasonry
Hardy is an active Freemason and was initiated into the Lodge City of Sydney No. 952 in 1962. He then served as Worshipful Master of his mother lodge in 1971. In 1976, he was appointed as Deputy Grand Master of the United Grand Lodge of New South Wales and the Australian Capital Territory, an office he served for two years.

Lodge Sir James Hardy No. 1046, on the register of the United Grand Lodge of New South Wales and the Australian Capital Territory is named after Hardy in his honour. The lodge was consecrated on 21 May 2011 and Hardy still maintains active membership in the lodge.

References 

Living people
1932 births
1970 America's Cup sailors
1974 America's Cup sailors
1980 America's Cup sailors
1983 America's Cup sailors
1987 America's Cup sailors
Australian Champions Soling
Australian Knights Bachelor
Australian male sailors (sport)
Australian Officers of the Order of the British Empire
Australian winemakers
Olympic sailors of Australia
People educated at St Peter's College, Adelaide
Recipients of the Australian Sports Medal
Sailors at the 1968 Summer Olympics – 5.5 Metre